In the 1991–92 season Panathinaikos played for 33rd consecutive time in Greece's top division, the Alpha Ethniki. They also competed in the European Cup and the Greek Cup.

Squad

Competitions

Alpha Ethniki

Classification

European Cup

First round

Second round

Group stage

Group A

References

External links
 Panathinaikos FC official website

Panathinaikos F.C. seasons
Panathinaikos